Bubbio is a comune (municipality) in the Province of Asti in the Italian region Piedmont, located about  southeast of Turin and about  southeast of Asti.

Bubbio borders the following municipalities: Canelli, Cassinasco, Cessole, Loazzolo, Monastero Bormida, and Roccaverano.

References

External links
 Official website

Cities and towns in Piedmont